The Jewish Chapel at the United States Military Academy is a synagogue and chapel for the worship of Jewish cadets, faculty and members of the West Point community.  Construction began in 1982 and was completed on November 13, 1984, it was the culmination of 20 years of effort on the part of the West Point Jewish Chapel Fund, a private nonprofit organization which raised more than US$7.5 million for its construction.

See also
Religious symbolism in the United States military

References

External links
West Point Jewish Chapel

United States Military Academy
Synagogues in Upstate New York
Military chapels of the United States
University and college chapels in the United States
Jewish-American military history
1984 establishments in New York (state)
Synagogues completed in 1984